Hormuzakia aggregata is a flowering annual plant in the Borage family, known by the common name massed alkanet.

Description 
It is a short-lived herbaceous plant with  ascending hispid stems. The entire leaves are alternate, linear-lanceolate. It flowers from January to April, the small flowers are dark blue to violet producing  hemispherical nutlets.

Taxonomy 
The species name Hormuzakia derives from Constantin Freiherr von Hormuzaki a prominent Austro-Romanian naturalist. The epithet aggregata, derives from Latin and means to bring together or cluster.
 The standard author abbreviation Lehm. is used to indicate Johann Georg Christian Lehmann (1792 – 1860), a German botanist.
 The standard author abbreviation Gusul. is used to indicate Mikail Gusuleac (1887-1960), a Romanian botanist.

Distribution and habitat 
It grows in Mediterranean woodlands, shrublands, shrub-steppes and deserts of Sicily, North East Egypt and the Sinai Peninsula, Libya, Algeria, Turkey, Cyprus, Lebanon, Israel, Rhodes, Saudi Arabia and the East Aegean Islands.

Uses 
The roots of Hormuzakia aggregata contain anchusin or alkannin (alkanet red), a red-brown resinoid pigment. Alkannin is an antioxidant and has an antimicrobial effect against Staphylococcus aureus and Staphylococcus epidermidis. It is also known to have wound healing, antitumor, and antithrombotic properties.

Alkannin is also found in the Chinese herbal medicine plant Lithospermum erythrorhizon, the red-root gromwell. The dried root is a Chinese herbal medicine with various antiviral and biological activities, including inhibition of human immunodeficiency virus type 1 (HIV-1).

References 

Flora of Lebanon
Flora of Israel
Flora of Palestine (region)
Boraginaceae